The 2022–23 New York Knicks season is the 77th season of the franchise in the National Basketball Association (NBA).

Draft

The Knicks entered the draft holding one first round picks and one second round picks. The Knicks used their 11th overall pick to select Ousmane Dieng who was then traded to the Oklahoma City Thunder, while the 42nd overall pick was used to select Trevor Keels.

Roster

Standings

Division

Conference

Game log

Preseason
The preseason schedule was announced on August 12, 2022.

|- style="background:#bfb;"
| 1
| October 4
| Detroit
| 
| Barrett (21)
| Hartenstein (7)
| Brunson (5)
| Madison Square Garden14,426
| 1–0
|- style="background:#bfb;"
| 2
| October 7
| Indiana
| 
| Toppin (24)
| Robinson (9)
| Brunson, Randle (4)
| Madison Square Garden16,510
| 2–0
|- style="background:#fbb;"
| 3
| October 12
| @ Indiana
| 
| Barrett (21)
| Hartenstein (10)
| Hartenstein, Randle (5)
| Gainbridge Fieldhouse7,081
| 2–1
|- style="background:#bfb;"
| 4
| October 14
| Washington
| 
| Brunson (27)
| Barrett, Robinson (12)
| Brunson, Fournier (5)
| Madison Square Garden19,812
| 3–1

Regular season
The regular season schedule was released on August 17, 2022.

|- style="background:#fbb;"
| 1
| October 19
| @ Memphis
| 
| Randle (24)
| Randle (11)
| Brunson (9)
| FedExForum18,202
| 0–1
|- style="background:#bfb;"
| 2
| October 21
| Detroit
| 
| Quickley (20)
| Hartenstein (11)
| Quickley (7)
| Madison Square Garden19,812
| 1–1
|- style="background:#bfb;"
| 3
| October 24
| Orlando
| 
| Randle (25)
| Randle (12)
| Quickley (8)
| Madison Square Garden18,800
| 2–1
|- style="background:#bfb;"
| 4
| October 26
| Charlotte
| 
| Brunson (27)
| Barrett, Robinson (8)
| Brunson (13)
| Madison Square Garden19,812
| 3–1
|- style="background:#fbb;"
| 5
| October 28
| @ Milwaukee
| 
| Barrett (20)
| Randle (12)
| Rose (4)
| Fiserv Forum17,341
| 3–2
|- style="background:#fbb;"
| 6
| October 30
| @ Cleveland
| 
| Brunson, Fournier (16)
| Hartenstein, Randle (9)
| Brunson, Randle (7)
| Rocket Mortgage FieldHouse19,432
| 3–3

|- style="background:#fbb;"
| 7
| November 2
| Atlanta
| 
| Brunson (20)
| Quickley (16)
| Barrett, Brunson (5)
| Madison Square Garden19,812
| 3–4
|- style="background:#bfb;"
| 8
| November 4
| @ Philadelphia
| 
| Brunson (23)
| Hartenstein, Randle (10)
| Brunson (7)
| Wells Fargo Center20,679
| 4–4
|- style="background:#fbb;"
| 9
| November 5
| Boston
| 
| Randle (29)
| Hartenstein (14)
| Brunson (10)
| Madison Square Garden19,812
| 4–5
|- style="background:#bfb;"
| 10
| November 7
| @ Minnesota
| 
| Randle (31)
| Randle (8)
| Brunson (8)
| Target Center14,524
| 5–5
|- style="background:#fbb;"
| 11
| November 9
| @ Brooklyn
| 
| Randle (24)
| Randle (11)
| Quickley (4)
| Barclays Center18,156
| 5–6
|- style="background:#bfb;"
| 12
| November 11
| Detroit
| 
| Barrett (30)
| Hartenstein (12)
| Brunson (7)
| Madison Square Garden19,812
| 6–6
|- style="background:#fbb;"
| 13
| November 13
| Oklahoma City
| 
| Reddish (26)
| Randle (10)
| Brunson (7)
| Madison Square Garden18,325
| 6–7
|- style="background:#bfb;"
| 14
| November 15
| @ Utah
| 
| Brunson (25)
| Sims (13)
| Brunson (8)
| Vivint Arena18,206
| 7–7
|- style="background:#bfb;"
| 15
| November 16
| @ Denver
| 
| Randle (34)
| Randle (11)
| Brunson (7)
| Ball Arena18,210
| 8–7
|- style="background:#fbb;"
| 16
| November 18
| @ Golden State
| 
| Randle (20)
| Sims (10)
| Barrett (5)
| Chase Center18,064
| 8–8
|- style="background:#fbb;"
| 17
| November 20
| @ Phoenix
| 
| Brunson (27)
| Randle (6)
| Grimes (8)
| Footprint Center17,071
| 8–9
|- style="background:#bfb;"
| 18
| November 21
| @ Oklahoma City
| 
| Brunson (34)
| Randle (11)
| Brunson (9)
| Paycom Center15,079
| 9–9
|- style="background:#fbb;"
| 19
| November 25
| Portland
| 
| Brunson (32)
| Barrett (10)
| Barrett, Grimes, Quickley (5)
| Madison Square Garden19,812
| 9–10
|- style="background:#fbb;"
| 20
| November 27
| Memphis
| 
| Brunson (30)
| Randle (10)
| Brunson, Randle (9)
| Madison Square Garden19,524
| 9–11
|- style="background:#bfb;"
| 21
| November 29
| @ Detroit
| 
| Randle (36)
| Robinson (13)
| Brunson, Randle (5)
| Little Caesars Arena14,864
| 10–11
|- style="background:#fbb;"
| 22
| November 30
| Milwaukee
| 
| Barrett (26)
| Robinson (20)
| Brunson, Randle (5)
| Madison Square Garden17,277
| 10–12

|- style="background:#fbb;"
| 23
| December 3
| Dallas
| 
| Randle (24)
| Toppin (7)
| 5 players (3)
| Madison Square Garden18,319
| 10–13
|- style="background:#bfb;"
| 24
| December 4
| Cleveland
| 
| Brunson (23)
| Robinson (11)
| Brunson, Randle (4)
| Madison Square Garden19,007
| 11–13
|- style="background:#bfb;"
| 25
| December 7
| Atlanta
| 
| Randle (34)
| Randle (17)
| Brunson, McBride (6)
| Madison Square Garden18,091
| 12–13
|- style="background:#bfb;"
| 26
| December 9
| @ Charlotte
| 
| Randle (33)
| Robinson (13)
| Brunson (11)
| Spectrum Center17,696
| 13–13
|- style="background:#bfb;"
| 27
| December 11
| Sacramento
| 
| Barrett, Randle (27)
| Barrett, Hartenstein, Robinson (9)
| Barrett (6)
| Madison Square Garden19,812
| 14–13
|- style="background:#bfb;"
| 28
| December 14
| @ Chicago
| 
| Randle (31)
| Randle (13)
| Brunson, Randle (7)
| United Center18,820
| 15–13
|- style="background:#bfb;"
| 29
| December 16
| @ Chicago
| 
| Barrett (27)
| Randle (12)
| Brunson (6)
| United Center19,661
| 16–13
|- style="background:#bfb;"
| 30
| December 18
| @ Indiana
| 
| Brunson (30)
| Randle (14)
| Brunson, Randle (3)
| Gainbridge Fieldhouse14,513
| 17–13
|- style="background:#bfb;"
| 31
| December 20
| Golden State
| 
| Quickley (22)
| Randle (12)
| Barrett, Brunson, Randle (5)
| Madison Square Garden19,812
| 18–13
|- style="background:#fbb;"
| 32
| December 21
| Toronto
| 
| Barrett, Randle (30)
| Randle (13)
| Brunson (12)
| Madison Square Garden19,294
| 18–14
|- style="background:#fbb;"
| 33
| December 23
| Chicago
| 
| Barrett (44)
| Randle (12)
| Brunson (9)
| Madison Square Garden19,812
| 18–15
|- style="background:#fbb;"
| 34
| December 25
| Philadelphia
| 
| Randle (35)
| Robinson (16)
| Brunson (11)
| Madison Square Garden19,812
| 18–16
|- style="background:#fbb;"
| 35
| December 27
| @ Dallas
| 
| Grimes (33)
| Randle (18)
| Quickley (15)
| American Airlines Center20,377
| 18–17
|- style="background:#fbb;"
| 36
| December 29
| @ San Antonio
| 
| Randle (41)
| Randle (11)
| Quickley, Randle (7)
| AT&T Center18,354
| 18–18
|- style="background:#bfb;"
| 37
| December 31
| @ Houston
| 
| Randle (35)
| Randle, Robinson (12)
| Quickley (7)
| Toyota Center18,055
| 19–18

|- style="background:#bfb;"
| 38
| January 2
| Phoenix
| 
| Randle (28)
| Randle (16)
| Brunson, Randle (6)
| Madison Square Garden19,812
| 20–18
|- style="background:#bfb;"
| 39
| January 4
| San Antonio
| 
| Brunson (38)
| Randle (13)
| Brunson (6)
| Madison Square Garden19,812
| 21–18
|- style="background:#bfb;"
| 40
| January 6
| @ Toronto
| 
| Randle (32)
| Robinson (18)
| Brunson (8)
| Scotiabank Arena19,800
| 22–18
|- style="background:#fbb;"
| 41
| January 9
| Milwaukee
| 
| Brunson (44)
| Randle (16)
| Randle (5)
| Madison Square Garden18,167
| 22–19
|- style="background:#bfb;"
| 42
| January 11
| Indiana
| 
| Brunson (34)
| Randle (16)
| 4 players (4)
| Madison Square Garden18,249
| 23–19
|- style="background:#bfb;"
| 43
| January 13
| @ Washington
| 
| Brunson (34)
| Randle (16)
| Brunson (8)
| Capital One Arena20,476
| 24–19
|- style="background:#bfb;"
| 44
| January 15
| @ Detroit
| 
| Randle (42)
| Randle (15)
| Brunson, Randle (4)
| Little Caesars Arena19,894
| 25–19
|- style="background:#fbb;"
| 45
| January 16
| Toronto
| 
| Barrett (32)
| Randle (15)
| Randle (8)
| Madison Square Garden19,812
| 25–20
|- style="background:#fbb;"
| 46
| January 18
| Washington
| 
| Brunson (32)
| Randle (15)
| Brunson, Randle (4)
| Madison Square Garden19,164
| 25–21
|- style="background:#fbb;"
| 47
| January 20
| @ Atlanta
| 
| Randle (32)
| Randle (9)
| Brunson (9)
| State Farm Arena17,711
| 25–22
|- style="background:#fbb;"
| 48
| January 22
| @ Toronto
| 
| Barrett (30)
| Randle (19)
| Randle (8)
| Scotiabank Arena19,261
| 25–23
|- style="background:#bfb;"
| 49
| January 24
| Cleveland
| 
| Randle (36)
| Randle (13)
| Quickley (6)
| Madison Square Garden19,812
| 26–23
|- style="background:#bfb;"
| 50
| January 26
| @ Boston
| 
| Randle (37)
| Sims (14)
| Brunson (7)
| TD Garden19,156
| 27–23
|- style="background:#fbb;"
| 51
| January 28
| @ Brooklyn
| 
| Brunson (26)
| Randle, Sims (10)
| Randle (8)
| Barclays Center18,100
| 27–24
|- style="background:#fbb;"
| 52
| January 31
| L.A. Lakers
| 
| Brunson (37)
| Hartenstein (13)
| Quickley (8)
| Madison Square Garden19,812
| 27–25

|- style="background:#bfb;"
| 53
| February 2
| Miami
| 
| Barrett (30)
| Hartenstein, Randle (10)
| Randle (6)
| Madison Square Garden19,044
| 28–25
|- style="background:#fbb;"
| 54
| February 4
| L.A. Clippers
| 
| Brunson (41)
| Hartenstein, Randle (11)
| Brunson, Randle (7)
| Madison Square Garden19,812
| 28–26
|- style="background:#bfb;"
| 55
| February 5
| Philadelphia
| 
| Randle (24)
| Hartenstein (14)
| Brunson, Randle (7)
| Madison Square Garden17,586
| 29–26
|- style="background:#bfb;"
| 56
| February 7
| @ Orlando
| 
| Brunson (25)
| Randle (14)
| Randle (6)
| Amway Center19,438
| 30–26
|- style="background:#fbb;"
| 57
| February 10
| @ Philadelphia
| 
| Brunson, Randle (30)
| Randle (10)
| Brunson (9)
| Wells Fargo Center21,057
| 30–27
|- style="background:#bfb;"
| 58
| February 11
| Utah
| 
| Brunson (38)
| Hartenstein (14)
| Brunson (5)
| Madison Square Garden19,339
| 31–27
|- style="background:#bfb;"
| 59
| February 13
| Brooklyn
| 
| Brunson (40)
| Randle (10)
| Brunson, Quickley (5)
| Madison Square Garden19,812
| 32–27
|- style="background:#bfb;"
| 60
| February 15
| @ Atlanta
| 
| Brunson (28)
| Hartenstein, Randle (11)
| Brunson (5)
| State Farm Arena17,771
| 33–27
|- style="background:#bfb;"
| 61
| February 24
| @ Washington
| 
| Randle (46)
| Robinson (12)
| Brunson (9)
| Capital One Arena20,476
| 34–27
|- style="background:#bfb;"
| 62
| February 25
| New Orleans
| 
| Randle (28)
| Robinson (13)
| Barrett (7)
| Madison Square Garden19,812
| 35–27
|- style="background:#bfb;"
| 63
| February 27
| Boston
| 
| Quickley, Randle (23)
| Robinson (13)
| Hart (5)
| Madison Square Garden19,812
| 36–27

|- style="background:#bfb;"
| 64
| March 1
| Brooklyn
| 
| Brunson (39)
| Robinson (10)
| Randle (8)
| Madison Square Garden19,812
| 37–27
|- style="background:#bfb;"
| 65
| March 3
| @ Miami
| 
| Randle (43)
| Randle (9)
| Brunson (8)
| Miami-Dade Arena19,600
| 38–27
|- style="background:#bfb;"
| 66
| March 5
| @ Boston
| 
| Quickley (38)
| Robinson (14)
| Quickley (7)
| TD Garden19,156
| 39–27
|- style="background:#fbb;"
| 67
| March 7
| Charlotte
| 
| Barrett (27)
| Hart, Randle, Robinson (8)
| Quickley (5)
| Madison Square Garden19,812
| 39–28
|- style="background:#fbb;"
| 68
| March 9
| @ Sacramento
| 
| Barrett (25)
| Hart (15)
| Hart (7)
| Golden 1 Center18,068
| 39–29
|- style="background:#fbb;"
| 69
| March 11
| @ L.A. Clippers
| 
| Quickley (26)
| Robinson (14)
| Grimes, Hart, Quickley (4)
| Crypto.com Arena19,068
| 39–30
|- style="background:#bfb;"
| 70
| March 12
| @ L.A. Lakers
| 
| Randle (33)
| Hartenstein (11)
| Randle (5)
| Crypto.com Arena18,997
| 40–30
|- style="background:#bfb;"
| 71
| March 14
| @ Portland
| 
| Quickley (26)
| Hartenstein (11)
| Hart (8)
| Moda Center19,488
| 41–30
|- style="background:#bfb;"
| 72
| March 18
| Denver
| 
| Brunson (24)
| Hartenstein, Robinson (9)
| Brunson, Hart (5)
| Madison Square Garden19,812
| 42–30
|- style="background:#;"
| 73
| March 20
| Minnesota
| 
| 
| 
| 
| Madison Square Garden
| 
|- style="background:#;"
| 74
| March 22
| @ Miami
| 
| 
| 
| 
| FTX Arena
| 
|- style="background:#;"
| 75
| March 23
| @ Orlando
| 
| 
| 
| 
| Amway Center
| 
|- style="background:#;"
| 76
| March 27
| Houston
| 
| 
| 
| 
| Madison Square Garden
| 
|- style="background:#;"
| 77
| March 29
| Miami
| 
| 
| 
| 
| Madison Square Garden
| 
|- style="background:#;"
| 78
| March 31
| @ Cleveland
| 
| 
| 
| 
| Rocket Mortgage FieldHouse
| 

|- style="background:#;"
| 79
| April 2
| Washington
| 
| 
| 
| 
| Madison Square Garden
| 
|- style="background:#;"
| 80
| April 5
| @ Indiana
| 
| 
| 
| 
| Gainbridge Fieldhouse
| 
|- style="background:#;"
| 81
| April 7
| @ New Orleans
| 
| 
| 
| 
| Smoothie King Center
| 
|- style="background:#;"
| 82
| April 9
| Indiana
| 
| 
| 
| 
| Madison Square Garden
|

Player statistics

Regular season statistics
As of March 19, 2023

|-
| style="text-align:left;"| || 11 || 0 || 2.4 || .200 || .333 ||  || .4 || .2 || .2 || .0 || .3
|-
| style="text-align:left;"| || 65 || 65 || 34.1 || .435 || .314 || .746 || 5.1 || 2.7 || .4 || .2 || 19.9
|-
| style="text-align:left;"| || 63 || 63 || 34.9 || .486 || .414 || .835 || 3.6 || 6.1 || .9 || .2 || 23.8
|-
| style="text-align:left;"| || 23 || 7 || 18.0 || .351 || .324 || .857 || 2.0 || 1.5 || .6 || .1 || 6.8
|-
| style="text-align:left;"| || 61 || 56 || 29.1 || .447 || .358 || .790 || 3.1 || 1.9 || .6 || .4 || 9.8
|-
| style="text-align:left;"| || 15 || 0 || 30.3 || .598 || .556 || .780 || 7.1 || 3.9 || 1.3 || .3 || 11.2
|-
| style="text-align:left;"| || 72 || 7 || 19.6 || .516 || .222 || .741 || 6.7 || 1.0 || .6 || .8 || 4.8
|-
| style="text-align:left;"| || 2 || 0 || 2.0 || .333 || .333 ||  || 1.0 || .0 || .0 || .0 || 1.5
|-
| style="text-align:left;"| || 56 || 2 || 12.0 || .360 || .311 || .684 || .8 || 1.1 || .6 || .1 || 3.5
|-
| style="text-align:left;"| || 13 || 0 || 3.1 || .500 || .600 || .600 || .5 || .1 || .1 || .0 || 1.6
|-
| style="text-align:left;"| || 71 || 15 || 28.4 || .444 || .358 || .819 || 4.1 || 3.2 || .9 || .2 || 13.6
|-
| style="text-align:left;"| || 72 || 72 || 35.9 || .457 || .341 || .757 || 10.3 || 4.1 || .7 || .3 || 25.2
|-
| style="text-align:left;"| || 20 || 8 || 21.9 || .449 || .304 || .879 || 1.6 || 1.0 || .8 || .4 || 8.4
|-
| style="text-align:left;"| || 50 || 49 || 27.3 || .689 ||  || .490 || 9.1 || .9 || .9 || 1.6 || 7.5
|-
| style="text-align:left;"| || 27 || 0 || 12.5 || .384 || .302 || .917 || 1.5 || 1.7 || .3 || .2 || 5.6
|-
| style="text-align:left;"| || 49 || 16 || 15.8 || .769 || .000 || .750 || 4.7 || .5 || .3 || .6 || 3.5
|-
| style="text-align:left;"| || 57 || 0 || 14.4 || .416 || .326 || .784 || 2.8 || .8 || .3 || .2 || 6.2

Transactions

Trades

Additions

Subtractions

References

External links
 2022–23 New York Knicks at Basketball-Reference.com

New York Knicks
New York Knicks seasons
New York Knicks
New York Knicks
2020s in Manhattan
Madison Square Garden